Anaparti railway station (station code:APT), is an Indian Railways station in Anaparti, a town in East Godavari district of Andhra Pradesh. It lies on the Vijayawada–Chennai section and is administered under Vijayawada railway division of South Coast Railway zone. Thirty-four trains halt in this station every day. It is the 717th-busiest station in the country.

History
The southern part of the East Coast State Railway (from Waltair to Vijayawada) was taken over by Madras Railway in 1901.

Classification 
In terms of earnings and outward passengers handled, Anaparti is categorized as a Non-Suburban Grade-5 (NSG-5) railway station. Based on the re–categorization of Indian Railway stations for the period of 2017–18 and 2022–23, an NSG–5 category station earns between – crore and handles  passengers.

Station amenities 

It is one of the 38 stations in the division to be equipped with Automatic Ticket Vending Machines (ATVMs).

References

External links 

Railway stations in East Godavari district
Vijayawada railway division